, the Bengals flagship radio stations are WCKY, "ESPN 1530" and 102.7 WEBN, with WLW AM 700 joining in following the end of the Reds' season. Dan Hoard and former Bengals offensive lineman Dave Lapham, who started in 1985, form the announcing team. Most preseason and regular season games, are telecast on WKRC-TV, channel 12, the CBS affiliate. Mike Watts and Anthony Muñoz are the TV announcers for the preseason games, with Mike Valpredo as the sideline reporter. Games that feature an NFC opponent playing at Paul Brown Stadium will be televised on WXIX, channel 19, the local Fox affiliate. WLWT-TV airs games when the Bengals are featured on Sunday Night Football.

Past
Phil Samp was the Bengals original play-by-play announcer from 1968–1990. Ken Broo (1991–1995), Paul Keels (1996), Pete Arbogast (1997–2000) and Brad Johansen (2000–2010) have also done radio play-by-play for the Bengals. Steve Physioc was also one of the voices of the Bengals.

Bengals radio announcers

Cincinnati Bengals
Cincinnati Bengals
 
broadcasters